To Tell the Truth is a Canadian version of the original 1956 American game show To Tell the Truth. It was broadcast on CTV between 1962 and 1964. The show was hosted by Don Cameron and the panelists included Toby Tarnow, Robert Hall, Dorothy Cameron and Stan Helleur. It aired at 10 PM on Thursdays.

External links 
 To Tell the Truth at Canadian Communications Foundation
 Game Show Forum messageboard

1962 Canadian television series debuts
1964 Canadian television series endings
1960s Canadian game shows
CTV Television Network original programming